The Baseball America Rookie of the Year Award is an annual award granted by Baseball America to the best rookie in the major leagues.

Awardees

See also

Jackie Robinson Rookie of the Year Award (MLB; in each league)
"Esurance MLB Awards" Best Rookie (in MLB)
"Players Choice Awards" Outstanding Rookie (in each league)
Sporting News Rookie of the Year Award
Rookie of the Month

List of MLB awards

References

External links
Baseball America Rookie of the Year winner – Winners since 1989, when the award was established.

Major League Baseball trophies and awards
Awards by magazines
Awards established in 1989
Rookie player awards